Chamois Public School, also known as American Legion Post 506, is a historic school building located at Chamois, Osage County, Missouri.  It was built in 1876, and expanded in 1896.  It is a two-story, "L"-shaped, red brick building with a three-story clock tower with a pyramidal top.  It has segmental and rounded arched window openings.  The American Legion purchased the building in 1947.

It was listed on the National Register of Historic Places in 2003.

References 

Clock towers in Missouri
School buildings on the National Register of Historic Places in Missouri
School buildings completed in 1876
Buildings and structures in Osage County, Missouri
National Register of Historic Places in Osage County, Missouri